The Biscay Regional Championship (Campeonato Regional de Vizcaya), also called the North Regional Championship (Campeonato Regional Norte) in its early editions, was an official football tournament in Spain organised by the North Football Federation.

It was played annually between 1913 and 1940 and served to elect the representatives of the region in the Spanish Cup, which at that time served as the overall annual national championship.

History 
The tournament was launched in 1913, following the creation of the North Football Federation (Federación Norte), initially consisting of clubs from the Basque provinces (Biscay, Gipuzkoa and Álava) and Cantabria (then the province of Santander). The first edition of the Northern Regional Championship started on 12 October 1913, with six teams: three from Biscay (Athletic Bilbao, Arenas Club de Getxo and Deportivo de Bilbao) and three from Gipuzkoa (Real Sociedad, Sporting de Irun and Racing de Irun – the latter two would soon merge as Real Unión). Athletic was the first champion.

In 1916 the Royal Spanish Football Federation permitted the clubs from the province of Santander to abandon the North Federation and join the new Cantabrian Regional Federation of Football, along with clubs from the province of Oviedo. But the situation was reversed again two years later.

After several disagreements between the clubs of Biscay and Gipuzkoa, culminating in a pivotal championship match between Athletic and Real Sociedad being abandoned, in 1918 the National Committee of the Spanish federation agreed to divide the Northern Federation in these two regions. Thus, in the 1918–19 season the Gipuzkoa clubs launched their own championship while the North Championship teams continued with other Basque teams and the return of Racing de Santander, representing the Cantabrian clubs.

In 1922 the clubs in the province of Santander finally left the North Federation to create its own umbrella organisation, which launched the Cantabrian Regional Championship. That same year, the Assembly of the Northern Federation agreed to the change of name to the Biscay Federation (Federación Vizcaína), being composed exclusively of clubs from the province (although Deportivo Alavés of Álava also participated in the championship).

In 1934 the Spanish federation undertook a major restructuring of the national tournaments, so that the regional championships were replaced by the superregional, which gathered the best clubs in various regional federations. In the case of the Basque Country, this was called the Basque Cup, launched in season 1934–35. This tournament was held for two years until being interrupted by the Spanish Civil War.

During the last months of the war in 1939, football resumed activity in some areas controlled by the National side, under the impetus of the Spanish Federation and the regional federations. Five teams participated in the reborn Biscay Championship, including its winners Bilbao Athletic (a team formed by Athletic Bilbao, who decided not to use the club's official title as they only had a makeshift squad and were worried about embarrassing results tarnishing their reputation) and runner-up Barakaldo Oriamendi, who both took part in the 1939 Copa del Generalísimo.

The last edition of the Championship of Biscay, which was also a qualifier for access to the 1940 Copa del Generalísimo, was played in the 1939–40 season. Another restructuring approved by the Spanish Federation in 1940 marked the demise of the regional championships.

Winners

Notes

Summary of Champions

Notes

See also
Biscay autonomous football team
History of Athletic Bilbao

References 

 Martínez Calatrava, Vicente (2001). Historia y estadística del fúbol español. 

Defunct football competitions in Spain
Basque football competitions
Sports leagues established in 1913
Sports leagues disestablished in 1940
1913 establishments in Spain
1940 disestablishments in Spain
History of football in Spain
Sport in Biscay